Atopobium is a genus of Actinomycetota, in the family Coriobacteriaceae. Atopobium species are anaerobic, Gram-positive rod-shaped or elliptical bacteria found as single elements or in pairs or short chains.

Atopobium vaginae was discovered in 1999. This is a facultative anaerobic bacteria, which form small colonies on blood agar at 37 °C is also positive for acid phosphatase.  This species has now been reclassified into the genus Fannyhessea following phylogenetic studies.

Clinical significance
The genus Atopobium may be associated with bacterial vaginosis.

The genus may play a role in the development of Colorectal cancer. While the genus has been reported as overrepresented in feces of patients, A. minutum has conversely shown a mild apoptotic effect on cancer cells in vitro and has been suggested to be comparable to probiotic bacteria in regards to colorectal cancer.

See also
 List of bacterial vaginosis microbiota

References

External links
https://web.archive.org/web/20070929134318/http://sn2000.taxonomy.nl/Main/Classification/112091.htm

Coriobacteriaceae
Bacteria genera